The byfoged was a former Danish municipal officer. The title is sometimes translated as "bailiff", "magistrate", or "stipendiary magistrate".

Government of Denmark